George Burt Goetz    was a starting pitcher who played in Major League Baseball for the Baltimore Orioles of the American Association. He pitched in one game on June 17, 1889. This allowing four earned runs in nine innings.

Sources

Baltimore Orioles (AA) players
19th-century baseball players
Major League Baseball pitchers
Baseball players from Pennsylvania
1865 births
Lynchburg Hill Climbers players
Year of death missing
York (minor league baseball) players
People from Franklin County, Pennsylvania